Capitol Collector Series is a compilation album from Grand Funk Railroad released in 1991. In January 2002, the album was certified Gold by the RIAA.

Track listing 
All songs written and composed by Mark Farner except where noted.
"Time Machine" – 3:45
"Heartbreaker" – 6:35
"Inside Looking Out" (Eric Burdon/Chas Chandler) – 9:33
"Closer to Home/I'm Your Captain" – 10:10
"Mean Mistreater" – 5:03
"Feelin' Alright" (Dave Mason) – 4:26
"Gimme Shelter" (Mick Jagger/Keith Richards) – 6:17
"Footstompin' Music" – 3:47
"Rock & Roll Soul" – 3:26
"We're an American Band" (Don Brewer) – 3:27
"Walk Like a Man (You Can Call Me Your Man)" (Brewer/Farner) – 4:06
"The Loco-Motion" (Gerry Goffin/Carole King) – 2:58
"Shinin' On" (Brewer/Farner) – 5:56
"Some Kind of Wonderful" (John Ellison) – 3:17
"Bad Time" – 2:53

References 

1991 compilation albums
Grand Funk Railroad compilation albums
Capitol Records compilation albums